Bhavnagar is a city in the Bhavnagar district of the Saurashtra region of Gujarat, a state of India. It was founded in 1723 by Bhavsinhji Takhtasinhji Gohil (1703–1764). It was the capital of Bhavnagar State, which was a princely state before it was merged into the Indian Union in 1948. It is now the administrative headquarters of the Bhavnagar district.

Bhavnagar is situated 190 kilometres away from the state capital Gandhinagar and to the west of the Gulf of Khambhat. It has always been an important city for trade with many large and small scale industries along with the world's largest ship breaking yard, Alang which is located 50 kilometres away. Bhavnagar is also famous for its version of the popular Gujarati snack 'Ganthiya' and 'Jalebi'.

History

The Gohil Rajput of the Suryavanshi clan faced severe competition in Marwar. Around 1260 AD, they moved down to the Gujarat's coastal area and established three capitals: Sejakpur (now Ranpur), Umrala, and Sihor. Sejakpur was founded in 1194.

In 1722–1723, the forces led by Khanthaji Kadani and Maratha Pilaji Gaekwad attempted to raid Sihor but were repelled by Maharajah Bhavsinhji Gohil. After the war, Bhavsinhji realized the reason for repeated attack was the location of Sihor. In 1723, he established a new capital near Vadva village, 20 km away from Sihor, and named it Bhavnagar after himself. It was a carefully chosen strategic location because of its potential for maritime trade. Naturally, Bhavnagar became the capital of Bhavnagar State. In 1807, Bhavnagar State became a British protectorate.

The old town of Bhavnagar was a fortified town with gates leading to other important regional towns. It remained a major port for almost two centuries, trading commodities with Mozambique, Zanzibar, Singapore, and the Persian Gulf.

Bhavsinhji ensured that Bhavnagar is benefited from the revenue that was brought in from maritime trade, which was monopolized by Surat and Cambay. As the castle of Surat was under the control of the Siddis of Janjira, Bhavsinhji brokered an agreement with them, giving the Sidis 1.25% of the revenue by Bhavnagar port. Bhavsinhji entered into a similar agreement with the British when they took over Surat in 1856. Whilst Bhavsinhji was in power, Bhavnagar grew from a small chieftainship to a considerably important state. This was due to the addition of new territories as well as the income provided by maritime trade. Bhavsinhji's successors continued to encourage maritime trade through Bhavnagar port, recognizing its importance to the state. The territory was further expanded by Bhavsinhji's grandson, Vakhatsinhji Gohil, when he took possession of lands belonging to Kolis and Kathis, obtained Rajula from the Navab Saheb Ahmad Khan, and merged Ghogha Taluka into the state.

In 1793, Vakhatsinhji conquered the forts of Chital and Talaja, and later conquered Mahuva, Kundla, Trapaj, Umrala and Botad. Bhavnagar remained the main port of the state, with Mahuva and Ghogha also becoming important ports. Because of the maritime trade, the state prospered compared to other states. During the late 19th century, the Bhavnagar State Railway was constructed. This made Bhavnagar the first state that was able to construct its railway system without any aid from the central government, which was mentioned in The Imperial Gazetteer of India. Mr. Peile, a political agent, described the state as follows: "With flourishing finances and much good work in progress. Of financial matters I need say little; you have no debts, and your treasury is full." Between 1870 and 1878, the state were put under joint administration, due to the fact that Prince Takhtsinhji was a minor. This period produced some notable reforms in the areas of administration, revenue collection, judiciary, the post and telegraph services, and economic policy. The ports were also modernized. The two people who were responsible for those reforms were E. H. Percival of the Bombay Civil Service and Gaurishankar Udayshankar Oza, Chief Minister of Bhavnagar State Bhavnagar Boroz.

In 1911,  Maharani Nundkanvarba of Bhavnagar was awarded the Order of the Crown of India, the highest Imperial award for women of the British Empire. The former princely state of Bhavnagar was also known as Gohilwad, "Land of the Gohils" (the clan of the ruling family).

Merger with the Indian Union in 1947

Until the independence of India in 1947, Bhavnagar was an independent state ruled by the Rajput Gohil family. In 1947, the Deputy Prime Minister of the newly independent Indian Union Sardar Vallabhbhai Patel undertook the ambitious and complex process of unifying 562 princely states with the Union of India. The last ruling Maharajah of Bhavnagar, Krishnakumar Sinhji handed over the administration of his Bombay State to the people's representative in 1948.

Honorable Maharaja Krishna Kumarsinhji was the First King of India whom give up his state (all area) to make a United India, due to this reason Sardar Vallabhbhai Patel was highly impressed by him and made him Governor of Madras State After Independence of India.

The current royal family of Bhavnagar comprises Maharajah Vijayraj Singh Gohil and Maharani Samyukta Kumari, Prince Yuvraj Jaiveerraj Singh Gohil, and Princess Brijeshwari Kumari Gohil.

The erstwhile royal family of Bhavnagar continues to lead an active role in the public eye as well as in business (hotels, real estate, agriculture, and ship-breaking) and is held in high regard by the population both in the city as well as areas that comprised the former princely state of Bhavnagar.

Geography and climate

Topography
It has an average elevation of 24 metres (78 ft). It occupies an area of 53.3 km2 (20.6 sq mi) and 5th most populated city of Gujarat. The general slope dips towards the northeast at the apex of Gulf of Khambhat. A small non-perennial river named Kansara Nala passes through the outer area of the city.

Climate
Like most of Gujarat, Bhavnagar has a hot semi-arid climate (Köppen: BSh), with hot, dry summers from March to mid-June, the wet monsoon season from mid-June to October, and mild winters from November to February. The semi-arid classification is due to the city's high evapotranspiration.

Geology

The region of Saurashtra is a geologically active part of West India, and falls in the seismic zone 3 of the Zoning Map of the Bureau of Indian Standards. The region as a whole and the area around Bhavnagar, in particular, has been tectonically unstable.

Between 9 August 2000 and 15 December 2000, there was a series of earthquakes in east Saurashtra with epicenters in Bhavnagar. 132 earthquakes between magnitude 0.5 to 3.8 were recorded. There were five earthquakes greater than magnitude 3, with a maximum magnitude of 3.8. These events were confined to an area which covered the southern part of Bhavnagar city and Tarsamiya village on the outskirts of the town. There was no loss of life recorded due to this earthquake.

According to historical records, an earthquake of magnitude 7 occurred near Bhavnagar in February 1705. Earthquake swarm activity also occurred in and around Paliyad (60 km north of Bhavnagar) during July–August 1938 for about two months, with four earthquakes of magnitude greater than or equal to 5 and a maximum magnitude of 6.0.

City planning and architecture

Multiple town planning schemes were designed and implemented under the guidance of the progressive rulers of Bhavnagar. During the reign of Sir Takhtsinhji, the British State Engineer Proctor Sims supervised the construction of Barton Library, Sir Takhtsinhji Hospital.

A few architectural examples include:
Takhteshwar Temple (1893) is located on a hill, on a high plinth, offering a commanding view of Bhavnagar. The high shikhara rising above the pillared rectangular mandapa makes it an important landmark.
 Gangajalia (1893) is a temple dedicated to Ganga-Devi, with a chhatri, pavilion, and bridge all of white marble. It is located in the middle of a former tank. It was designed by Sir John Griffith, principal of Sir J J School of Arts, Bombay.
It was designed by a British architect, William Emerson as a royal residence; he also designed the Sir Takhtsinhji Hospital and later Victoria Memorial in Calcutta. It combines elements of Indian architecture with a modern outlook.
 Barton Library (1895) is a two-storeyed building, appropriately designed for a road junction. It has two wings and a central tower, constructed in ashlar stone masonry, with Gothic arch windows and a sloping roof with Mangalore tiles. It is one of the oldest libraries of Gujarat and also houses a museum.
 Town Hall (1932) was formerly a Darbar Hall, where the coronation of Sir Krishnakumarsinhji took place. It is an imposing structure in the colonial style, set in a well laid out garden.
Modern & Contemporary Architectural services is provided by various leading Architectural firm like SAGA whose work is diverse yet of unified character, not only functional, aesthetic and techno-savvy.

Modern Bhavnagar comprises Takhteshvar Plots, Krishnanagar, Sardarnagar and surrounding area. During 1935–1937, Krishnanagar area was planned and developed by late Shri Virendrabhai C. Mehta, the official town planner for the State of Bhavnagar. In 1961, he extended his Krishnanagar plan towards Sardarnagar. In 1975, he created a master plan for Bhavnagar.

A salient feature of town planning is to have gardens at the junction of roads. Gardens are located at Ghogha Circle, Mahila College Circle, Rupani Circle, Meghani Circle, Shivaji Circle, Sardarnagar Circle, Jewels Circle and Crescent Circle.

The city of Bhavnagar was one of the earliest towns to have underground drainage in Gujarat, and was among the first cities in Gujarat to have a water filtration plant. When set up by Krishna Kumarsinhji Bhavsinhji, the filtration plant was the largest in Asia.

Education

Bhavnagar has various schools and educational institutions. Nanabhai Bhatt, Gijubhai Badheka, Manbhai Bhatt (founder of Shishuvihar), Harbhai Trivedi, and Taraben Modak helped develop the rural and women's education.
Samaldas Arts College where Mahatma Gandhi studied in 1888 is one of the oldest institutions to provide higher education. Some of the other institutions which provide higher education are Bhavnagar University, Shantilal Shah Engineering College, Government Engineering College, Bhavnagar.

Schools

 Calorx Public School
 Amar Jyoti International School
 Fatima Convent School
 Shree Gyanmanjari Vidyapith
 Shree Naimisharanya School
 The K. P. E. S. School

Universities and colleges

 Government Engineering College, Bhavnagar
 Government Medical College, Bhavnagar
 Maharaja Krishnakumarsinhji Bhavnagar University
 Samaldas Arts College (first college in Bhavnagar)
 Shantilal Shah Engineering College
 Smt. R.D. Gardi Bhavnagar Stree (affiliated to SNDT Women's University)

Research and development 

Because of its salt and marine environment, Bhavnagar has a research and development centre known as - Central Salt and Marine Chemicals Research Institute  (CSMCRI).

Economy and industry

Industrial development in Bhavnagar district could be attributed to the presence of a large number of diamond cutting and polishing units, salt and marine chemicals, plastics, shipbuilding, and ship-breaking industries.
Bhavnagar is an important center for the diamond cutting and polishing industry in Gujarat as well as India. Thousands of skilled diamond-polishing workers are employed in diamond-cutting and polishing firms, whose subsidiary offices are involved in cities like Surat, Mumbai, and Antwerp. Bhavnagar stands second in the diamond cutting and polishing industry after Surat in India, with 6,000 units operating from the district and employing more than 300,000 people. Bhavnagar's commercial importance is enhanced by its proximity to the Gulf of Cambay and the Arabian Sea.

Bhavnagar is the largest producer of salt, with 34,500 tons of salt being produced annually in the district. The Alang ship breaking yard is the biggest in the world, recycling about 50% of the salvaged ships of the world. This has also helped develop supporting industries, such as oxygen bottling plants, re-rolling mills, and induction furnaces.

Industrial Estates 
Bhavnagar district has various Industrial estates where many MSME industries are growing very rapidly with a great reputation around the world. Many aides from the state and central government helped increase the number of industries in these areas. Some of the Industrial estates that are in Bhavnagar districts jurisdiction are given below.

Commerce

 Exports of cotton, ship machinery and dehydrated onions
 Diamond cutting, polishing, and marketing
 Manufacture of diamond jewellery
 Manufacture of plastic rope, yarn, twine
 Re-rolling mills for steel recovered from the ship-breaking yard at Alang
 Manufacture of investment castings with lost wax process (ferrous and non-ferrous)
 Other large-scale manufacturing industries, such as fertiliser, soda-ash, steel casting, etc.

Agriculture
Main crops:
 Groundnut, onion, cotton, and bajra.
 Guavas and pomegranate.and mango
 Sagwadi Farm of Gyr cattle breed

Demographics

 India census, Bhavnagar had a population of 593,768.  Bhavnagar has an average literacy rate of 86%, higher than the national average of 59.5%; with male literacy of 91% and female literacy of 80%. 10% of the population is under 6 years of age. Adult males constitute 52% of the population and females 48%.

Transportation

Bhavnagar is well-connected to other cities of Gujarat such as Ahmedabad, Surat and Vadodara by road, with bus services operated by the state-owned transport corporation. buses serves as a local transport in the city. Bhavnagar Terminus under the Bhavnagar railway division, serving the city, connect it to Ahmedabad, Mumbai, Surat, Vadodara, Mangalore, Kochi, Trivandrum, Mumbai, New Delhi, Kolkata, Chennai, Bangalore, Kanpur, Kakinada (Train No. 17203)and other major cities of India by rail road. Bhavnagar airport is connected to Mumbai by air links. Daily flights are currently operated by Alliance Air (India). Private auto rickshaws are other modes of transport within the city and nearby villages.

Tourism

Bhavnagar has several places and sites of interest to tourists :

 Nilambag Palace is the residence of the current Maharajah of Bhavnagar,  Maharaol Vijayrajsinhji Virbhadrasinhji Gohil, and his family.  It is now also a heritage palace hotel and a restaurant too.
 Barton Library is a two-storeyed building, with two wings and a central tower, constructed in ashlar stone masonry with gothic arch windows and a sloping roof with Mangalore tiles. Opened in 1882, it is one of the oldest libraries in Gujarat and also houses a museum.
 Gandhi Smriti is a memorial library for Mahatma Gandhi. It also has a fine collection of art objects representing the culture of the Saurashtra region.
 Central Salt and Marine Chemicals Research Institute (CSMCRI) is the only constituent laboratory of the Council of Scientific and Industrial Research (CSIR) in Gujarat. A significant research effort is being carried out here to develop biodiesel from Jatropha.
 Nishkalank Mahadev - 20 km from he city of Bhavnagar a village Koliyak is known for seashore. There is a temple of Mahadeva. It is said that Pandvas came here to remove their Sins of killing own brother. They came here and their flag converted its colour to white. that's why it is called Nishkalank Mahadev. A big gathering to take blessing of Mahadeva at every month of "Bhadrapad" Amavasya.
 Regional Science Museum Bhavnagar - is the new science museum of bhavnagar

Ports
Bhavnagar had trade links with Southeast Asia, Africa, Arabia and ports of Red Sea since the early 18th century. The old port Bhavnagar Harbar was built by the state of Bhavnagar, and hosted a light beacon since 1860. This port was later modernised in 1930 under the supervision of J. Johnston, then port officer of Bhavnagar state. Wharfs, warehouses, and railway transportation were added. This port also had a lighthouse, which was damaged in the 2001 earthquake.

Bhavnagar lockgate, built in 1963 and the first of its kind in India when built, is one of the oldest port in the state, and is very useful to keep ships afloat during low tide.

Notable people

Bhavnagar has produced many reformists, thinkers, socialists, poets, writers, artists, educationists, and independence activists.

 Gijubhai Badheka – educationist and reformer
 Thakkar Bapa - Social Worker
 Krishna Kumarsinhji Bhavsinhji – Last Ruler of Bhavnagar
 Mulshankar Bhatt – an educationist
 Nanabhai Bhatt – founder of Lok Bharti, educationist, creative writer, thinker
 Nazir Dekhaiya – poet
 Gangasati – a medieval Gujarati saint poet who wrote many devotional songs. The shrine of Gangasati and Panbai is situated on the riverbed of the Kalubhar river.
 Parthiv Gohil – Bollywood & Gujarati film singer
 Shaktisinh Gohil – Member of Parliament, Rajya Sabha, former minister of education, health, finance, Narmada, in Gujarat government
 Sheldon Jackson – a first class cricketer of Saurashtra
 Chirag Jani – cricketer of Saurashtra cricket team
 Kavi Kant – a royal poet of Bhavnagar state

 Apara Mehta – television actress
 Asoka Mehta – (24 October 1911, Bhavnagar – 10 December 1984, New Delhi) Indian Freedom Fighter and Socialist Politician. 
 Balwantrai Mehta – second chief minister of Gujarat martyred in 1965.
 Asha Parekh – Bollywood film actress
 Prahlad Parekh – poet
 Ravishankar Raval – a painter, art teacher, art critic, journalist, and essayist

 Chetan Sakariya - Indian cricketer
 Somalal Shah – a painter
 Gaurishankar Udayshankar, Chief minister-Regent of Bhavnagar 1870-1887 - for Takhtsinhji 
 Jitu Vaghani, Education Minister Government of Gujarat

Food 
Bhavnagar is popular for its fafadiya ganthiya, bhavnagari samosa, pav ganthiya and bateta bhungal .

See also 
 List of twin towns and sister cities in India

References

External links

 Government/Administration:
Bhavnagar Area Development Authority
Bhavnagar Municipal Corporation
Bhavnagar Collectorate
Bhavnagar District Panchayat

 
Former capital cities in India
Saurashtra (region)
1723 establishments in India